Commentary on the New Testament Use of the Old Testament was edited by G. K. Beale and D. A. Carson, and published by Baker Books in 2007.

It is a comprehensive Bible commentary on Old Testament references within the New Testament. The editors headed a team of scholars to identify, explain and comment on both the direct quotations within the text of the New Testament and its many other probable allusions to the Old.

In a 2008 interview, Beale explained that the writers eclectically extended the historical-grammatical method of exegesis, seeking a "biblical-theological perspective that really goes beyond the traditional understanding of grammatical-historical."

Contributors

Reception
The commentary won the 2008 Christianity Today Award of Merit in Biblical Studies, was finalist in the 2008 Christian Book Award in the Bible and Reference Category, and was named Academic Book of the Year (2008) by the Association of Theological Booksellers.

Although it was the work of a team of Protestant scholars, Catholic apologist Scott Hahn welcomed the Commentary as "a momentous accomplishment" and "invaluable resource" for Protestants and Catholics alike.

Availability
As well as a 1,152-page print edition, the Commentary is available in digital form as an e-book for Amazon Kindle, and as a Bible software add-on for products including  Accordance, Logos, QuickVerse and WORDsearch.

References

External links
 Excerpt (Introduction & Acts chapter 2) available from Westminster Theological Seminary

New Testament Use of the Old
2007 non-fiction books
New Testament theology
Old Testament theology